The Conseil scolaire acadien provincial is the Francophone school board for Nova Scotia.

It was created in 1996.

Schools

Centre scolaire Étoile de l'Acadie (pr to 12); Sydney
École acadienne de Pomquet (pr to 12); Pomquet
École Beau-Port (pr to 12); Arichat
École NDA (pr to 12); Chéticamp
Centre Scolaire de la Rive-Sud (pr to 12); Cookville
École acadienne de Truro (pr to 12); Truro
École Rose-des-Vents (pr to 12); Greenwood
École du Carrefour (5 to 8); Dartmouth
École Bois-Joli (pr to 4); Dartmouth
École secondaire Mosaïque (9 to 12); Burnside, Nova Scotia
École des Beaux-Marais (pr to 4); Porters Lake
École secondaire du Sommet (6 to 12); Halifax
École Beaubassin (pr to 5); Halifax
École du Grand-Portage (pr to 7); Lower Sackville
École Belleville (pr to 6); Tusket
École Joseph-Dugas (pr to 6); Pointe-de-l'Église
École Pubnico-Ouest (pr to 6); Pubnico-Ouest
École secondaire de Clare (7 to 12); Riviére-Meteghan
École secondaire de Par-en-Bas (7 to 12); Tusket
École Stella-Maris (pr to 6); Meteghan
École Wedgeport (pr to 6); Wedgeport
École Mer et Monde (pr to 6); Halifax

See also
List of Nova Scotia schools
Nova Scotia Department of Education

External links
 CSAP official web site

1996 establishments in Nova Scotia
French-language school districts in Canada
School districts established in 1996
School districts in Nova Scotia